Sigurd Vestad (July 31, 1907 – January 17, 2001) was a Norwegian cross-country skier who competed in the 1932 Winter Olympics.

He was born in Trysil.

In 1932 he finished fifth in the 50 km competition.

At the FIS Nordic World Ski Championships 1935 he finished fourth in the 18 km competition.

Cross-country skiing results
All results are sourced from the International Ski Federation (FIS).

Olympic Games

World Championships

References

External links
 Sigurd Vestad's profile at Sports Reference

1907 births
2001 deaths
Norwegian male cross-country skiers
Olympic cross-country skiers of Norway
Cross-country skiers at the 1932 Winter Olympics
People from Trysil
Sportspeople from Innlandet